John Reuben Drake (November 28, 1782 in Pleasant Valley, Dutchess County, New York – March 21, 1857 in Owego, Tioga County, New York) was a U.S. Representative from New York.

Life
He was the son of Rev. Reuben Drake (a Baptist minister from a line of wealthy landowners) and Phoebe Sherwood. Drake completed preparatory studies and engaged in mercantile and agricultural pursuits, such as projecting the New York & Erie Railroad. He married Jerusha Roberts, with whom he had a daughter, Delphine Drake.

He was Supervisor of the Town of Owego in 1813 and First Judge of the Broome County Court from 1815 to 1823. In 1823, he was one of three commissioners overseeing construction of the historic Tioga County Courthouse. Drake was a member of the Free Masons' lodge of Owego.

Drake was elected as a Democratic-Republican to the 15th United States Congress, holding office from March 4, 1817, to March 3, 1819. There he served on the Committee on Expenditures on the Public Buildings.

He was First Judge of the Tioga County Court from 1833 to 1838, a member of the New York State Assembly in 1834, and President of the Village of Owego from 1841 to 1845.

He was interred in Evergreen Cemetery.

References

Judge Drake at the Schenectady Digital History Archive
Journal of the House (on-line transcribed version)
The New York Civil List compiled by Franklin Benjamin Hough (pages 70, 216, 271, 358 and 365; Weed, Parsons and Co., 1858)

1782 births
1857 deaths
People from Pleasant Valley, New York
People from Owego, New York
New York (state) state court judges
People from Broome County, New York
Members of the New York State Assembly
Democratic-Republican Party members of the United States House of Representatives from New York (state)
19th-century American politicians
19th-century American judges